Atena Poznań was a Polish women's football club from Poznań.

The team played its first four seasons in the highest league I Liga and qualified for the then new founded Ekstraliga Kobiet. The league was too tough for Atena and the team got relegated again after the first season.

The team played another season in the I Liga, before joining with Poznaniak Poznań.

The team's greatest success was a third-place finish in 2001–2.

References 

Women's football clubs in Poland
Football clubs in Poznań
Association football clubs established in 2000
Association football clubs disestablished in 2007
Defunct football clubs in Poland
2000 establishments in Poland
2007 disestablishments in Poland